Events from the year 2013 in Kuwait.

Incumbents
Emir: Sabah Al-Ahmad Al-Jaber Al-Sabah 
Prime Minister: Jaber Al-Mubarak Al-Hamad Al-Sabah

Events

April
 April 15 - Kuwaiti opposition leader Musallam Al-Barrak is given a five-year prison sentence for insulting Emir Sabah Al-Ahmad Al-Jaber Al-Sabah.

June
 June 16 - Kuwait's Constitutional Court dissolves the nation's parliament and orders new elections.

July
 July 27 - Voters in Kuwait go to the polls for a general elections.

August
 August 29 - A Kuwaiti newspaper reports that Gulf leaders have been in touch with Israel, and have asked that Israel act “with restraint” in the event of an attack by Western nations on Syria.

References

 
Kuwait
Kuwait
Years of the 21st century in Kuwait
2010s in Kuwait